Blinkenlights is a neologism for diagnostic lights usually on the front panels on old mainframe computers, minicomputers, many early microcomputers, and modern network hardware. It has been seen as a skeuomorph on many modern office machines,  most notably on photocopiers.

Etymology 
The Jargon File provides the following etymology:

Origin
The phrase "blinkenlights" is a reference to a dated, conventional set of standard computer room posters that first appeared during World War II and then appeared prominently in IBM artifacts from 1955. It is also used as a joke for people who can't use a computer properly, and is written in mock German. One version of the slander passages read:

This silliness dates back at least as far as 1955 at IBM and had already gone international by the early 1960s, when it was reported at London University's ATLAS computing site.
There are several variants of it in circulation, some of which actually do end with the word 'blinkenlights'.
}}

Although the sign might initially appear to be in German and uses an approximation of German grammar, it is composed largely of words that are either near-homonyms of English words or (in the cases of the longer words) actual English words that are rendered in a faux-German spelling. As such, the sign is generally comprehensible by many English speakers regardless of whether they have any fluency in German, but mostly incomprehensible to German speakers with no knowledge of English. Much of the humor in these signs was their intentionally incorrect language.

Michael J. Preston relates the sign as being posted above photocopiers in offices as a warning not to mess with the machine in the first print reference from 1974. The sign is also reported to have been seen on an electron microscope at the Cavendish Laboratory in the 1950s.  Such pseudo-German parodies were common in Allied machine shops during and following World War II, and an example photocopy is shown in the Jargon File.

The Jargon File also mentions that German hackers had developed their own versions of the blinkenlights poster, in fractured English:

Actual blinkenlights 
The bits and digits in the earliest mechanical and vacuum tube-based computers were typically large and few, making it easy to see and often hear activity. Then, for decades, computers incorporated arrays of indicator lamps in their control panels, indicating the values carried on the address, data, and other internal buses, and in various registers. These could be used for diagnosing or "single-stepping" a halted machine, but even with the machine operating normally, a skilled operator could interpret the high-speed blur of the lamps to tell which section of a large program was executing, whether the program was caught in an endless loop, and so on.

With rising processor clock rates, increased memory sizes, and improved interactive debugging tools, such panel lights gradually lost their usefulness, though today most devices have indicators showing power on/off status, hard disk activity, network activity, and other indicators of "signs of life".

The original IBM PC could have a diagnostics card plugged into it that used LEDs to show what part of the memory it was using, and show the memory address and data code on 7-segment displays whenever the card was manually locked or automatically triggered.

The Connection Machine, a -processor parallel computer designed in the mid-1980s, was a black cube with one side covered with a grid of red blinkenlights; the sales demo had them evolving Conway's Game of Life patterns.

The CPU load monitors on the front of BeBoxes were also called "blinkenlights".

Several computer components, such as the Ballistix Tactical Tracer memory modules from Crucial Technology and the NVidia Titan GTX, have user-controllable lights that can be configured to show useful information, such as the memory capacity used and the temperature of the components.

This word gave its name to several projects, including screen savers, hardware gadgets, and other nostalgic things. Some notable enterprises include the German Chaos Computer Club's Project Blinkenlights and the Blinkenlights Archaeological Institute.

See also 
 Faxlore
 Macaronic language

References

Further reading

External links
 DEC indicator panels

Computer jargon
Computer humor
Tech humour